Shirley Gordon (1921-2008) was an American writer of radio programs, television shows, and children's books.

Early life 
Gordon was born on December 29, 1921, in Geneva, Illinois, to Russell Gordon, a police officer, and Viola LaVoy Gordon. She graduated from East Aurora High School in Aurora, Illinois in 1938.

Writing career 
Early in her career, Gordon wrote for and was assistant editor of Radio Life magazine. She was also a publicist for CBS.

Radio and television shows 
During the Golden Age of Radio, Gordon wrote scripts for anthology series Suspense ("The Statement of Mary Blake" in 1950 and "Death Parade" in 1951), The Whistler, and Elliott and Cathy Lewis' On Stage. When dramatic radio was revived in the 1970s, Gordon wrote scripts for The Hollywood Radio Theatre and Sears Radio Theatre.

From the 1950s-1970s, Gordon, sometimes credited as "Shirl Gordon", wrote episodes of popular sitcoms, including Bewitched, The Courtship of Eddie's Father, and My Three Sons. She wrote 49 episodes of The Bob Cummings Show.

Children's books 
Gordon published eight books for children in the 1970s and 1980s. Six are picture books and two are chapter books.

The Green Hornet Lunchbox (Houghton Mifflin, 1970), illustrated by Margaret Bloy Graham
Grandma Zoo (Harper & Row, 1978), illustrated by Whitney Darrow Jr.
The Boy Who Wanted a Family (Harper & Row, 1980), illustrated by Charles Robinson
Me and the Bad Guys (Harper & Row, 1980), illustrated by Edward Frascino

Four of the books were narrated by a girl named Susan about her friend Crystal. All of the Crystal books were illustrated by Edward Frascino.

Crystal Is the New Girl (Harper & Row, 1976)
Crystal Is My Friend (Harper & Row, 1978)
Happy Birthday, Crystal (Harper & Row, 1981)
Crystal's Christmas Carol (Harper & Row, 1989)

Personal life 
Gordon had one son, David Russell Gordon, whom she adopted. Two of her books, The Boy Who Wanted a Family and Me and the Bad Guys, were based on her son's experiences.

Gordon and several of her friends, including actress Barbra Fuller, met every Saturday for years to take walks around Hollywood; in a 1994 episode of Visiting... with Huell Howser, the "Hollywood walking ladies" reminisce about their experiences in Hollywood in the 1940s and 1950s.

Gordon died on February 22, 2008, in Glendale, California.

References

External links 
Shirley Gordon on IMDb
Script for On Stage episode "Call Me a Cab"
Script for On Stage episode "The Bunch of Violets"

People from Aurora, Illinois
American women journalists
Women radio writers
American women screenwriters
American women children's writers
American children's writers
1921 births
2008 deaths
20th-century American women writers
20th-century American screenwriters
21st-century American women